Tep Boprek (Khmer: ទេព បូព្រឹក្ស; (born December 22, 1993) is a female singer in Cambodia. She records for Cambodian production company Rasmey Hang Meas. Boprek began her career in 2012.



Discography

Solo albums
 2012: No More Lonely
 2013: ព្រមបែកព្រោះស្រលាញ់
 2013: Right Here Waiting For You
 2014: សង្សារថ្មីល្អនឹងបងទេ?
 2015: មិនជឿថាបងមិនស្រលាញ់អូន
 2016: Twerk
 2016: Bad Wonder Woman
 2017: My សង្សារ
 2017: ឲ្យអូនភ្លេចបងដូចឲ្យអូនភ្លេចដកដង្ហើម
 2021: Top Of The Lady

Performances
 2014: Teen Zone Concert (Khmer:តំបន់យុវវ័យ)
 2015: Water Music Concert (Khmer:តន្ត្រីលើទឹក)
 2016: Special Concert (Khmer:តន្ត្រីពិសេស)
 2017: Expert Concert on Hang Meas HDTV
 2017: ICHITAN Concert on Hang Meas HDTV
 2014–present: Hang Meas Tour Concerts (Tour Concerts are available on special events)

TV Show
 2016: I am a Singer Cambodia on Hang Meas HDTV
 2016: Killer Karaoke Cambodia (season 2) on Hang Meas HDTV

References
1. Tep Boprek, Pich Sophea have no style. Everyday.com.kh. Retrieved June 13, 2013. 
2. បទ Original ថ្មី របស់ទេព បូព្រឹក្ស កក្រើកខ្លាំង មានទាំងការសរសើរ និងរិះគន់ព្រមគ្នា. KhmerLoad. Retrieved July 12, 2016. 
3. បូព្រឹក្ស និង G-Devith កក្រើករឿងស្នេហ៍ជាថ្មី. Post Khmer. Retrieved March 7, 2017. 
4. Bad Wonder Woman” ទេព បូព្រឹក្ស នៅតែកប់ខ្លាំង!. Sabay News. Retrieved April 24, 2017.

External links
 Tep Boprek on Facebook
 Tep Boprek on Instagram

21st-century Cambodian women singers
1993 births
Living people
People from Phnom Penh